Tanglewood, also known as Tanglewood Ordinary and Tanglewood Tavern, is a historic hotel and tavern located near Maidens, Goochland County, Virginia.  The earliest section was built as a gas station in 1929. It is the front one-story projection. A large 2 1/2-story Rustic style log section was added in 1935. The rear addition was built as a restaurant / dance hall on the first floor and living quarters on the upper floors. A two-story "owners" house was built into a hillside behind Tanglewood in about 1950.

It was listed on the National Register of Historic Places in 2002.

References

External links
Tanglewood Ordinary website

Drinking establishments on the National Register of Historic Places in Virginia
Rustic architecture in the United States
Commercial buildings completed in 1935
Buildings and structures in Goochland County, Virginia
National Register of Historic Places in Goochland County, Virginia
Commercial buildings completed in 1929